Tracking stock, also known as letter stock and targeted stock, is a specialized equity offering issued by a company that is based on the operations of a defined business within the larger organization (such as, for instance, a wholly owned subsidiary of a diversified firm). Therefore, the tracking stock will be traded at a price related to the operations of the specific division of the company being "tracked". Tracking stock is typically limited, or has no voting rights. Often, tracking stock is issued to separate a high-growth (but initially, unprofitable) division from its parent company, while the parent company and its shareholders remain in control of the subsidiary's operations.

Overview
A tracking stock is issued from a corporation’s voting common stock as a special class of stock specifically tied to the financial performance of any type of definable business division, including a subsidiary, product line, or geographical territory. Stockholder benefits are confined to that division's earnings, and not to the larger company's overall performance. A parent company will retain a consolidated balance sheet and one board of directors, but issue separate income statements for its common stock and for its tracking stock. Reasons for issuing tracking stock may include attracting capital for atypical mergers and acquisitions, or increasing stock options for key executives.

Examples
During the dot-com bubble, some companies that predated the bubble identified their Internet operations as high-growth divisions that would benefit from a tracking stock.  The best-known example is The Walt Disney Company, which issued a tracking stock for go.com.  At around the same time the bubble ended, Disney retired the tracking stock.  AT&T (AWE) and Sprint Corporation (PCS) also established tracking stocks for their cellular telephone operations, but neither of these tracking stocks is still outstanding.

Applera was the successor company to what was previously the Life Sciences Division of PerkinElmer Corporation. Applera was not publicly traded, but instead it consisted of two major groups which were publicly traded tracking stocks in the proteomics industrial sector. These two groups, formed in 1999, were the S&P 500 listed Applera Corp-Applied Biosystems Group and Applera Corp-Celera Corporation Genomics Group. The two entities shared corporate functions and intellectual property. They also shifted products as their separate strategies changed. For instance, in 2002, marketing and sales of the human genome database developed by Celera was transferred to Applied Biosystems, which had a more appropriate sales structure to monetize the database. This allowed Celera to focus on new pharmaceutical initiatives.   The two entities did not have separate boards, so the Applera board had to balance the interests of the separate shareholders. In 2008, Applera spun off Celera into an independent company, after which Applera changed its name to Applied Biosystems. A merger between Applied Biosystems and Invitrogen was then finalized in 2008, creating Life Technologies. Celera was acquired by Quest Diagnostics in 2011, and Life Technologies was acquired by Thermo Fisher Scientific in 2014.

However, on September 25, 2011, Liberty Capital and Liberty Starz could no longer be traded, leaving only Liberty Media and Liberty Interactive as separate companies. Therefore, no major U.S. companies had tracking stocks until August 9, 2012, when Liberty Interactive issued tracking stock for itself using the symbols LINTA and LINTB and Liberty Ventures—formetly LVNTA and LVNTB on the Nasdaq.

Among other examples, in 1999 Quantum Corp. issued tracking stock in two subsidiaries: its DLT and Storage Systems Group (DSS) and its Hard Disk Drive Group (HDD). Two years later, in 2001, Quantum sold the Hard Disk Drive business to Maxtor and redeemed the HDD tracking stock.

See also
Dual-listed company
Tranche

References

External links
Focus:Tracking Stock
Companies Favor Tracking Stocks But Investors Can Get Derailed
Tracking stocks take on the telecom world

Securities (finance)